Cambrex Corporation is a Contract Development Manufacturing Organisation (CDMO) that provides drug substance, drug product and analytical services across the entire drug lifecycle, as well as active pharmaceutical ingredients (APIs). With over 2,200 employees in 7 countries across 13 locations, Cambrex operates in branded and generic markets for API and dosage form development and manufacturing.

Cambrex has cGMP manufacturing facilities in the US (Agawam, MA; Charles City, IA; Durham, NC; High Point, NC; Longmont, CO; Whippany, NJ), Canada (Mirabel, Québec) and Europe (Edinburgh, UK; Karlskoga, Sweden, Milan, Italy, and R&D centers in Tallinn, Estonia, Wiesbaden, Germany). The headquarters are located in East Rutherford, NJ.

2021 marks 40 years of Cambrex.

History
Cambrex was founded in 1981, when the CasChem group acquired the castor oil and derivatives product lines from NL Industries.  In 1987, CasChem was renamed Cambrex Corporation and became listed on NASDAQ. In 1990, Cambrex was listed on the NYSE.

Cambrex entered the pharmaceutical market in 1994 with the acquisition of Nobel Pharma Chemistry business, now known as Cambrex Karlskoga AB and Cambrex Profarmaco.

Through multiple acquisitions during the late 1990s, the firm entered the bioscience and the chiral enzymatic catalyst markets. Cambrex acquired two contract biopharmaceutical manufacturing facilities in 2001, to bulk manufacture biologics and pharmaceutical ingredients from clinical to commercial scales. In 2007, the firm decided to focus on its core competencies and sold the biologics business to Lonza Group.

In 2008, Prosyntest (now Cambrex Tallinn) was acquired, and Steve Klosk was appointed CEO, while remaining President.

To broaden their biocatalysis platform, Cambrex acquired IEP in 2010, now known as Cambrex IEP.

In 2013, Cambrex completed a major 7,000 sq. ft. facility expansion at Charles City, IA to increase API manufacturing capabilities for both existing products and a new product. Investment continued at Charles City, IA with a 45,000 sq. ft temperature and humidity-controlled cGMP warehouse space in 2015.

Cambrex continued to invest in its sites in 2016. Charles City, IA saw a significant expansion of its cGMP API manufacturing and storage capabilities  while large-scale manufacturing capabilities in Karlskoga, Sweden increased with the installation of new multi-purpose reactors and control room upgrades. Additional investment in 2016 saw Cambrex open a new pilot plant at its site in Paullo (Milan) Italy, allowing greater speed and flexibility for small scale API production. In 2016, Cambrex also expanded in its clinical stage API capabilities with the acquisition of PharmaCore, Inc. in High Point, NC, a leading early phase chemistry specialist with expertise in developing, scaling up and manufacturing small molecule APIs for clinical phase projects.

In 2017, Cambrex invested in new small scale capacity at its Charles City, IA facility with the installation of two 500 gallon glass lined reactors and created a third small scale work center, further increasing flexibility for customer projects. Additional investment in Charles City, IA was seen in the form of a new $24 million facility to manufacture highly potent APIs (HPAPIs). Cambrex also expanded its newly acquired High Point, NC facility with the addition of a new $3.2 million, 11,000 sq.ft. analytical laboratory, in response to growing customer demand for analytical development and validation services in support of cGMP products at the clinical stage. Investment in 2017 at the Karlskoga, Sweden facility saw new capacity and continuous flow technology for the production of high purity intermediates.

In 2018, Cambrex acquired Halo Pharma for $425 million adding drug product development and manufacturing capabilities to existing API services. In addition, Cambrex invested $5 million to expand its laboratory facilities in Karlskoga, Sweden which would help increase capacity for process development and scale up, handling of potent substances, crystallization studies and solid phase characterization. Cambrex continued to invest in continuous flow technology at its High Point, NC facility.

In 2019, Cambrex acquired Avista Pharma Solutions for $252m to become a fully integrated CDMO. In late 2019, Cambrex was acquired by an affiliate of the Permira funds.

In 2020, Cambrex completed a major expansion at its Edinburgh, UK facility known for solid form screening  alongside a biopharmaceutical expansion at its Durham, NC facility. Thomas Loewald was also appointed CEO of Cambrex in September 2020.

In November 2022, it was announced Cambrex had acquired the Waltham-headquartered chemical process development services provider, Snapdragon Chemistry.

References

External links

Companies formerly listed on the New York Stock Exchange
Pharmaceutical companies based in New Jersey
Pharmaceutical companies of the United States
Pharmaceutical companies established in 1981
2019 mergers and acquisitions
Companies based in Bergen County, New Jersey
East Rutherford, New Jersey